Niels-Peter Mørck (born 28 April 1990) is a Danish football midfielder who plays for Italian club Virtus Bolzano.

References

External links 
 
 
 

1990 births
Living people
People from Aabenraa Municipality
Danish men's footballers
Association football midfielders
Danish Superliga players
FC Sønderborg players
Esbjerg fB players
VfB Germania Halberstadt players
WSG Tirol players
Danish expatriate men's footballers
Expatriate footballers in Germany
Sportspeople from the Region of Southern Denmark